Dante Mircoli (born 12 March 1947) is a former Italian - Argentine footballer and coach who spent the majority of his career in Argentina.

Playing career
Mircoli was born in Italy but moved to Argentina as a child and became a nationalised Argentine. He made his professional debut in 1965 for Independiente. During his time with the club they won two league championships and Copa Libertadores 1972.

Mircoli played for a number of clubs in Italy with no great success, he made nine appearances in Serie A for Sampdoria in 1973 and also played for Catania and Lecco.

Mircoli also made appearances in the Argentine Primera for Estudiantes de La Plata and Racing Club de Avellaneda.

Managerial career
Mircoli managed a number of clubs in the lower leagues of Argentine football, including; Estudiantes (BA), Douglas Haig, San Telmo and Estudiantes (RC).

Titles
Primera División Argentina (2): Nacional 1967, Metropolitano 1971
Copa Libertadores (1): 1972

External links
 BDFA profile

Footballers from Rome
Italian footballers
Argentine footballers
Association football midfielders
Club Atlético Independiente footballers
Estudiantes de La Plata footballers
Club Atlético Platense footballers
Racing Club de Avellaneda footballers
U.C. Sampdoria players
Catania S.S.D. players
Calcio Lecco 1912 players
Argentine Primera División players
Serie A players
Argentine football managers
1947 births
Living people